Marmorofusus tuberculatus is a species of sea snail, a marine gastropod mollusc in the family Fasciolariidae, the spindle snails, the tulip snails and their allies.

Description

Distribution
This marine species occurs off East Africa and western Indian Ocean, including Somalia, Kenya, Tanzania, Mozambique, South Africa, Madagascar, Seychelles, Mauritius, La Réunion and Saya de Malha Bank.

References

 Bozzetti L. (2013) Fusinus tuberculatus priscai (Gastropoda: Neogastropoda: Fasciolariidae) nuova sottospecie dal Madagascar Sud-Orientale. Malacologia Mostra Mondiale 81: 13–14
 Bozzetti L. (2017). Fusinus tuberculatus fuscobandatus (Gastropoda: Neogastropoda: Fasciolariidae) nuova sottospecie dai Madagascar Sud-Occidentale. Malacologia Mostra Mondiale. 96: 35–36

External links
 Lamarck, [J.-B. M.] de. (1822). Histoire naturelle des animaux sans vertèbres. Tome septième. Paris: published by the Author, 711 pp.
 Anton, H. E. (1838). Verzeichniss der Conchylien welche sich in der Sammlung von Herrmann Eduard Anton befinden. Herausgegeben von dem Besitzer. Halle: Anton. xvi + 110 pp.
 Tapparone Canefri, C. (1875). Studio monografico sopra i Muricidi del mar Rosso. Annali del Museo Civico di Storia Naturale di Genova. 7: 569–640, pl. 19
 Lyons W.G. & Snyder M.A. (2019). Reassignments to the genus Marmorofusus Snyder & Lyons, 2014 (Neogastropoda: Fasciolariidae: Fusininae) of species from the Red Sea, Indian Ocean, and southwestern Australia. Zootaxa. 4714(1): 1–64

tuberculatus
Gastropods described in 1822